Kheyrabad (also Romanized as Kheyrābād; also known as Okheyrābād) is a village in Chenaran Rural District, in the Central District of Chenaran County, Razavi Khorasan Province, Iran. At the 2006 census, its population was 627, in 159 families.

References 

Populated places in Chenaran County